

Kevin Mulligan (born 23 June 1951) is a British philosopher, working on ontology, the philosophy of mind, and Austrian philosophy. He is currently Honorary Professor  at the University of Geneva, Full Professor at the University of Italian Switzerland, Director of Research at the Institute of Philosophy of Lugano, and member of the Academia Europaea and of the Royal Swedish Academy of Letters. He is also known for his work with Peter Simons and Barry Smith on metaphysics and the history of Austrian philosophy.

A major Festschrift on his work was published in 2014.<ref>Anne Reboul (Ed.), Mind, Values, and Metaphysics. Philosophical Essays in Honor of Kevin Mulligan, 2 volumes, Springer</ref>

Since 2016 he is academic director and professor at the Università della Svizzera italiana in Switzerland.

Bibliography
 Kevin Mulligan Bibliography
 Kevin Mulligan Recent Publications
 Kevin Mulligan, Peter Simons and Barry Smith, "What’s Wrong with Contemporary Philosophy?", Topoi, 25 (1-2), 2006, 63-67. 
 Anatomie della stoltezza. Jouvence, 2016. 
 Wittgenstein et la philosophie austro-allemande. Vrin, 2012. 
 Italian translation: Wittgenstein e la filosofia austro-tedesca. Mimesis, 2014. 
 Spanish translation: Wittgenstein y la filosofia austro-alemana. Tecnos, 2014. Décrire. La Psychologie de  Brentano (with Olivier Massin), Paris : Vrin, 2021. 

Edited volumesSpeech Act and Sachverhalt: Reinach and the Foundations of Realist Phenomenology, Dordrecht: Nijhoff, 1987. Mind, Meaning and Metaphysics: the Philosophy and Theory of Language of Anton Marty,  Dordrecht:  Kluwer, 1990.  Language, Truth and Ontology, Dordrecht: Kluwer, 1991 Wittgenstein analysé (ed. with J‑P. Leyvraz), Paris: Editions Jacqueline Chambon, 1993 Regards sur Bentham et l'utilitarisme (ed. with R. Roth), Geneva: Droz, 1993 Themes from Wittgenstein (ed. with B. Garrett), Working Papers in Philosophy, 4, Australian National University, Canberra, 1993.La Philosophie autrichienne de Bolzano à Musil. Histoire et Actualité  (ed. with J.-P. Cometti), Paris: Vrin, 2001. Les nationalismes (ed. with B. Baertschi), Paris: Presses Universitaires de France. 2001 

Romanian translation:Nationalismele, Bucharest: Nemira, 2010 Relations and Predicates: Philosophical Analysis (ed. with H. Hochberg), Frankfurt: Ontos Verlag, 2004  Robert Musil – Ironie, Satire, falsche Gefühle (ed. with A. Westerhoff), Paderborn: mentis Verlag, 2009. Studies in the History and Philosophy of Polish Logic.  Essays in  Honour of Jan Woleński (ed. with K. Kijania-Placek & T. Placek), Palgrave Macmillan, 2013. 

 See also 
 European Society for Analytic Philosophy

 References 

 External links 
 Homepage at the University of Geneva
 Wittgenstein et la philosophie austro-allemande
 Anne Reboul (Ed.), Mind, Values, and Metaphysics: Philosophical Essays in Honor of Kevin Mulligan'', 2 Volumes, London/New York: Springer, 
2014.
 Università della Svizzera Italiana professors

1951 births
20th-century British non-fiction writers
20th-century British philosophers
20th-century essayists
20th-century Irish non-fiction writers
20th-century Irish philosophers
21st-century British non-fiction writers
21st-century British philosophers
21st-century essayists
21st-century Irish non-fiction writers
21st-century Irish philosophers
Analytic philosophers
British ethicists
British logicians
British male essayists
Epistemologists
Historians of philosophy
Irish essayists
Irish ethicists
Irish logicians
Irish male non-fiction writers
Living people
Members of Academia Europaea
Metaphilosophers
Metaphysicians
Metaphysics writers
Ontologists
People from Shifnal
Philosophers of history
Philosophers of language
Philosophers of logic
Philosophers of mind
Philosophers of psychology
Philosophers of social science
Philosophy academics
Academic staff of the University of Geneva
Academic staff of the University of Lugano
Wittgensteinian philosophers